The 2016–17 NEC men's basketball season began with practices in October 2016, followed by the start of the 2016–17 NCAA Division I men's basketball season in November. Conference play started in late December and concluded in February 2017.

Mount St. Mary's clinched the regular season NEC championship with a win over St. Francis Brooklyn on February 25, 2017, marking their first NEC regular season crown in 21 years. LIU Brooklyn finished in second place in the regular season.

The NEC tournament was held from March 1 through March 7 with the higher-seeded team hosting each game. Mount St. Mary's defeated Saint Francis (PA) to win the NEC Tournament championship. As a result, Mount St. Mary's received the conference's bid to the NCAA tournament. Saint Francis (PA) received an invitation to CollegeInsider.com Postseason Tournament.

Head coaches

Coaching changes 
On April 6, 2016, Central Connecticut announced Donyell Marshall as the 10th head coach in program history. Marshall replaced Howie Dickenman, who retired after 20 years at Central Connecticut.

Coaches 

Notes: 
 All records, appearances, titles, etc. are from time with current school only. 
 Year at school includes 2016–17 season.
 Overall and NEC/NCAA records are from time at current school and are before the beginning of the 2016–17 season.
 Previous jobs are head coaching jobs unless otherwise noted.

Preseason

Preseason Coaches Poll
Source

() first place votes

Preseason All-NEC team
Source

NEC regular season

Conference matrix
This table summarizes the head-to-head results between teams in conference play.

Player of the week
Throughout the regular season, the Northeast Conference offices named a player of the week and a rookie of the week each Monday.

All-NEC honors and awards
Following the regular season, the conference selected outstanding performers based on a poll of league coaches.

Postseason

NEC Tournament

All games will be played at the venue of the higher seed

NCAA tournament

CollegeInsider.com Postseason Tournament

Milestones and records
On November 11, 2016 the Wagner Seahawks upset 18th ranked UConn on the road, marking one of the most significant wins in program history.

See also
2016–17 Northeast Conference women's basketball season

References

External links
NEC website